Martin Yarus (February 6, 1917 – March 7, 2008), better known by the stage name George Tyne, was an American stage and film actor and television director. He was blacklisted in the 1950s, and was indicted for contempt of Congress but subsequently acquitted.

Early life and career

Tyne, born in Philadelphia, Pennsylvania, began his acting career under the name Buddy Yarus. He used that name when appearing in the 1945 war film Objective Burma!, and in the Laurel and Hardy film The Dancing Masters (1943). As "George Tyne" he appeared in A Walk in the Sun, Sands of Iwo Jima and Thieves Highway.

Tyne also appeared on Broadway in a number of roles, including the hit 1954 play Lunatics and Lovers.

Congressional testimony and prosecution

Tyne was blacklisted from the movies in 1951 and from television in 1952, after his name was publicized in congressional committee hearings into alleged Communist infiltration of the entertainment industry.

In August 1955, the House Un-American Activities Committee held hearings in New York City to probe alleged Communist infiltration of Broadway, radio and television. Tyne was one of seven witnesses who refused to answer questions about whether they had been members of the Communist Party. Six cited their right to avoid self-incrimination under the Fifth Amendment to the U.S. Constitution, but Tyne simply refused to answer.

In his testimony, Tyne called actor Lee J. Cobb a "stool pigeon" for naming him as part of a "Communist group" in Hollywood in 1943. Tyne refused to say whether he knew Cobb, and said, "I think the privilege offered by the fifth amendment is wonderful for those who wish to take advantage of it, but I'm not standing on it." Tyne refused to identify a Communist Party card, shown to him by the committee counsel, which was made out to "Buddy" Yarus. Tyne said, "All these questions are an invasion of any personal and private ideas and associations."

In July 1956, Tyne was one of seven witnesses, including playwright Arthur Miller, who were cited for contempt of Congress of Congress by the House of Representatives. The other six included stage actress Sarah Cunninghan, her husband John Randolph, and actors Lou Polan and Stanley Prager.

In March 1957, Tyne was one of three entertainers who were indicted by a federal grand jury in New York for refusing to answer HUAC questions during its August 1955 hearings. The others were Pete Seeger and Elliot Sullivan. All were charged with contempt of Congress. Tyne was acquitted in 1961 on technical grounds.

Later life and career
Prior to his blacklisting, Tyne's last movie role was in the 1951 war film Decision Before Dawn. During the period of his blacklisting he worked mainly as a stage actor. He appeared in supporting roles in the 1954 off-Broadway revival of Threepenny Opera, the 1954 comedy Lunatics and Lovers, and Romanoff and Juliet (1957).

In the 1960s, Tyne began appearing in small roles on television and in the movies. He also began work as a television director.

Tyne directed episodes of The Love Boat, The Paul Lynde Show, M*A*S*H* and the 1979 TV series Friends. He returned to acting, in small roles, in TV shows and movies in the 1960s. His last film role was a bit part in the 1984 film, The Lonely Guy. In the early 1990s, he taught directing courses at the California Institute of the Arts.

Selected acting and directing credits

As film actor

 Doughboys in Ireland (1943) - Jimmy Martin
 The Iron Major (1943) - Boston College Player (uncredited)
 The Dancing Masters (1943) - Gangster (uncredited)
 The Racket Man (1944) - Soldier (uncredited)
 Ladies Courageous (1944) - Pilot (uncredited)
 Sailor's Holiday (1944) - Assistant Director (uncredited)
 Four Jills in a Jeep (1944) - Soldier (uncredited)
 Once Upon a Time (1944) - Jitterbug Dancer (uncredited)
 The Eve of St. Mark (1944) - Polinski (uncredited)
 Stars on Parade (1944) - Soldier (uncredited)
 Louisiana Hayride (1944) - Joe - Assistant Director (uncredited)
 Mr. Winkle Goes to War (1944) - Johnson (uncredited)
 Main Street After Dark (1945) - Serviceman in Police Station (uncredited)
 Objective, Burma! (1945) - Pvt. Soapy Higgins (uncredited)
 Brewster's Millions (1945) - Cab Driver (uncredited)
 A Walk in the Sun (1945) - Pvt. Jake Friedman
 Life with Blondie (1945) - Cassidy (uncredited)
 Miss Susie Slagle's (1946) - Davies (uncredited)
 Deadline at Dawn (1946) - Soft Drink Proprietor (uncredited)
 Rolling Home (1946) - Joe
 Seven Were Saved (1947) - Sergeant Blair
 They Won't Believe Me (1947) - Lieutenant Carr
 Body and Soul (1947) - Charlie's Friend (uncredited)
 Open Secret (1948) - Harry Strauss
 Call Northside 777 (1948) - Tomek Zaleska (uncredited)
 The Red Pony (1949) - Charlie (uncredited)
 The Lone Wolf and His Lady (1949) - Paul Braud (uncredited)
 Sword in the Desert (1949) - Dov
 Thieves' Highway (1949) - Charles - Dock Henchman (uncredited)
 Sands of Iwo Jima (1949) - Pfc. Harris
 The Outriders (1950) - Outrider at Dance (uncredited)
 Side Street (1950) - Det. Roffman (uncredited)
 No Way Out (1950) - Whitey (uncredited)
 Decision Before Dawn (1951) - Sgt. Griffin
 Circus World (1964) - Madrid Bartender (uncredited)
 Not with My Wife, You Don't! (1966) - Sgt. Dogerty
 Don't Make Waves (1967) - Newspaperman #1
 The Counterfeit Killer (1968) - George
 The Boston Strangler (1968) - Dr. Kramer
 The Lost Man (1969) - Plainclothesman
 Marlowe (1969) - Oliver Hady
 Tell Them Willie Boy Is Here (1969) - Le Marie
 Skin Game (1971) - Bonner
 Mr. Ricco (1975) - Lt. Barrett
 I Will, I Will... for Now (1976) - Dr. Morrison
 Romantic Comedy (1983) - Doctor #2
 The Lonely Guy (1984) - Director at Party (final film role)

As television director
 Good Morning World (1967)
 The Good Guys (1969)
 The Odd Couple (1970-1972)
 The Paul Lynde Show (1972-1973)
 Love, American Style (1971-1973)
 Needles and Pins  (1973-1974)
 The Bob Newhart Show (1973-1974)
 The San Pedro Beach Bums (1977)
 M*A*S*H (1975-1978)
 The Love Boat''' (1978-1980)

See also
McCarthyism

References

External links
 
 
 
 U.S. District court ruling in U.S. vs. Yarus

American male film actors
Hollywood blacklist
American male stage actors
Male actors from Philadelphia
1917 births
2008 deaths
20th-century American male actors